Kevin Kiernan is an Australian writer, geomorphologist, and conservationist.

He has written about the West Coast Range  and Mount Field National Park of Tasmania.

He was an academic geomorphologist at the University of Tasmania.

He was one of the individuals present at the change of the focus of the former South West Tasmania Action Committee that led to the founding of the Tasmanian Wilderness Society in 1976, and was the first director.

References

Australian geomorphologists
Australian conservationists
Tasmanian Wilderness Society
Living people
United Tasmania Group
Year of birth missing (living people)
Writers from Tasmania